Jól á leið til jarðar (English: Christmas on the Way to Earth) is an Icelandic television series that first aired on Icelandic public television channel Sjónvarpið in December 1994. The series is a part of  Jóladagatal Sjónvarpsins, an ongoing series of televised advent calendars. It was created by Sigurður Örn Brynjólfsson and Friðrik Erlingsson, and was the first stop-motion advent calendar on Icelandic television. The show was produced at Nukufilm studios in Tallinn, Estonia.

The show was voiced by actors and comedians Sigurður Sigurjónsson, Laddi and Örn Árnason.

Jól á leið til jarðar was rerun on Sjónvarpið in December 1999 and 2007.

A physical advent calendar containing leads to each episode's plot was published in conjunction with the initial airing of the series.

Premise 
Two inexperienced angels from heaven must deliver a casket containing the holiday of Christmas to Earth in time for Christmas Eve, as the evil Öngull attempts to steal the casket, and sink it in the deepest black hole in space.

References

1990s Icelandic television series
1994 Icelandic television series debuts
1994 Icelandic television series endings
Icelandic-language television shows
Christmas television series